Gillellus healae, the masked stargazer, is a species of sand stargazer native to the Atlantic and Gulf coasts of the United States from South Carolina to the Florida Keys as well as around Aruba where it can be found on sandy bottoms at depths of from .  It is an ambush predator, burying itself nearly completely in the sand and waiting for prey to happen by.  This species can reach a length of  TL. The specific name honours Elizabeth Heal who was Technical Secretary at the Gulf Coast Research Laboratory in Ocean Springs, Mississippi.

References

healae
Fish described in 1982
Taxa named by Charles Eric Dawson